Tomfoolery (German: Allotria) is a 1936 German comedy film directed by Willi Forst and starring Renate Müller, Jenny Jugo and Anton Walbrook. It was shot at the Johannisthal Studios in Berlin. The film's sets were designed by the art directors Kurt Herlth and Werner Schlichting. It premiered at the Gloria-Palast in Berlin on 12 June 1936. A pair of friends fall in love with the same woman, before realizing they are really in love with two other women. Racing to his romantic interest, one of the friends (Heinz Rühmann) takes by chance part in the Monaco Grand Prix.

Joseph Goebbels remarked:  "Quite energetic and lively. But it's overdone and therefore not totally satisfying. Less would be more." (original: „Sehr flott und mit viel Tempo. Aber übertrieben an Effekten, und darum nicht ganz befriedigend. Weniger wäre mehr.“)

Cast

References

Bibliography 
 Hake, Sabine. Popular Cinema of the Third Reich. University of Texas Press, 2001.
 Klaus, Ulrich J. Deutsche Tonfilme: Jahrgang 1936. Klaus-Archiv, 1988.

External links 
 

1936 films
Films of Nazi Germany
German comedy films
German black-and-white films
1936 comedy films
1930s German-language films
Films directed by Willi Forst
Cine-Allianz films
1930s German films
Films shot at Johannisthal Studios